The 2019 Football Championship of Mykolaiv Oblast was won by Varvarivka Mykolaiv.

MFC Pervomaisk competed parallelly in the 2018–19 Ukrainian Football Amateur League and the 2019–20 Ukrainian Football Amateur League.

First stage

Group North

Group Center

Group South

Group East

Second stage

References

Football
Mykolaiv
Mykolaiv